The Lake Wales Ridge National Wildlife Refuge is part of the United States National Wildlife Refuge (NWR) System, located in four separated areas on the Lake Wales Ridge east of US 27 between Davenport and Sebring Florida.  The 1,194 acre (4.8 km2) refuge was established in 1990, to protect a host of plants and animals.  It is also the first to be designated primarily for the preservation of endangered plants, and is not open to the general public. It contains a high proportion of remaining Florida scrub habitat.  It is administered as part of the Merritt Island National Wildlife Refuge.

Management
Since 2012 the Lake Wales Ridge NWR has been administered by the Everglades Headwaters National Wildlife Refuge Complex, along with the Pelican Island NWR, Archie Carr NWR, and the Everglades Headwaters National Wildlife Refuge and Conservation Area.

Flora
The plants the refuge was designed to protect are the snakeroot (Eryngium cuneifolium), scrub blazing star (Liatris ohlingerae), Carter's mustard (Warea carteri), papery Whitlow-wort (Paronychia chartacea), Florida bonamia (Bonamia grandiflora), scrub lupine (Lupinus aridorum), highlands scrub hypericum (Hypericum cumulicola), Garett's mint (Dicerandra christmanii), scrub mint (Dicerandra frutescens), pygmy fringetree (Chionanthus pygmaeus), wireweed (Polygonum basiramia), sandlace (Polygonum dentoceras), Florida ziziphus (Ziziphus celata), and scrub plum (Prunus geniculata).

Fauna
The animals the refuge was designed to protect are the Florida scrub jay (Aphelocoma coerulescens), eastern indigo snake (Drymarchon corais couperi), bluetail mole skink (Eumeces egregius lividus), and sand skink (Neoseps reynoldsi).

References

External links

 

Protected areas of Highlands County, Florida
Protected areas of Polk County, Florida
National Wildlife Refuges in Florida
1990 establishments in Florida
Protected areas established in 1990